The 2009 Malaysia Cup (Malay: Piala Malaysia 2009) was the 83rd edition of the Malaysia Cup. The competition began on 26 September 2009. Twenty teams took part in the competition. The teams were divided into five groups of four teams. The group leaders and the three best second-placed teams in the groups after six matches qualified to the quarterfinals.

Group stage

Group A

Group B

Group C

Group D

Group E

Second-placed qualifiers
At the end of the group stage, a comparison was made between the second placed teams. The three best second-placed teams advanced to the quarter-finals.

Knockout stage

Bracket

Quarterfinals

First leg

Second leg

Kelantan won 4 – 1 on aggregate.

Negeri Sembilan won 5 – 0 on aggregate.

Perlis won 4 – 1 on aggregate.

Terengganu 2 – 2 Selangor on aggregate. Terengganu won 5-4 on penalties.

Semifinals

First leg

Second leg

Kelantan advances 5-1 on aggregate

Negeri Sembilan advances 4-1 on aggregate

Final

Statistics

Top Scorer

References

Malaysia Cup seasons
Cup

ms:Piala Malaysia 2010